Ouro Sogui Airport  is an airport serving Matam, a city on the Sénégal River and capital of the Matam Region in Senegal.

References

External links
 
 

Airports in Senegal
Matam Region